Dwight Thornton Reed (May 13, 1915 – May 31, 2000) was an American football player, coach of football, basketball, and track, and college athletics administrator. He served as the head football coach at Louisville Municipal College—now known as Simmons College of Kentucky—in Louisville, Kentucky and Lincoln University in Jefferson City, Missouri from 1949 to 1972, compiling a career college football coaching record of 149–84–7. As a college football player, Reed lettered three times at the University of Minnesota and competed on the Gopher's 1935 and 1936 national championship squads.

Head coaching record

Football

References

External links
 

1915 births
2000 deaths
American football ends
Basketball coaches from Minnesota
Lincoln Blue Tigers athletic directors
Lincoln Blue Tigers football coaches
Lincoln Blue Tigers men's basketball coaches
Louisville Municipal Bantams football coaches
Minnesota Golden Gophers football players
College track and field coaches in the United States
Players of American football from Saint Paul, Minnesota
African-American coaches of American football
African-American players of American football
African-American basketball coaches
20th-century African-American sportspeople